Joseph James McLoughlin (August 21, 1878 – December 1962) was an American rower who competed in the 1904 Summer Olympics. In 1904 he won the silver medal in the double sculls.

References

External links
Joseph McLoughlin's profile at databaseOlympics
Joseph McLoughlin's profile at Sports Reference.com

1878 births
1962 deaths
Rowers at the 1904 Summer Olympics
Olympic silver medalists for the United States in rowing
American male rowers
Medalists at the 1904 Summer Olympics